Asa Dickinson Watkins (June 5, 1856 – April 14, 1938) was an American judge and politician who served as a member of the Virginia House of Delegates and Virginia Senate.

Early life
Asa D. Watkins was born on June 5, 1856, at "Ingleside" near Farmville, Virginia to Francis Watkins, a judge, banker and churchman. He attended private schools in Prince Edward County and attended Hampden–Sydney College. In 1878, he left college in his senior year. He then studied law under his father and in 1880 attended lectures at the University of Virginia. He was admitted to the bar in 1884.

Career
Watkins served as deputy clerk of the county court for seven years. He served as the sheriff of Prince Edward County from 1880 to 1881. He also worked in the cotton business in Birmingham, Alabama for a short time.

After getting admitted to the bar, Watkins became the senior member of the law firm of Watkins and Brock. In 1886, he became judge of Prince Edward County, but resigned that post in 1891 to become prosecuting attorney. Watkins represented Prince Edward County in the Virginia House of Delegates for the session of 1897-1898. He was elected to the Virginia State Senate in 1899, representing Prince Edward, Cumberland and Amelia counties. Watkins served as town attorney for Farmville from 1898 to his death.

Watkins served as the secretary-treasurer of the board of trustees of the State Normal School (later State Teachers' College). He served as trustee of Hampden–Sydney College from 1886 to 1932. He served as trustee of the Normal and Industrial Institute for Negroes (now Virginia State University) in Petersburg for 20 years.

Personal life
On September 2, 1886, Watkins married Nannie Edwards Forbes, daughter of Colonel William W. Forbes and Amonette Cobb Forbes, of Buckingham County. They had eight children: William Forbes, Samuel W., Mrs. Maurice Miller, Frank Nathaniel Watkins, Asa D., Patsy, Nancy and foster daughter Mrs. Joseph Powell.

Watkins died on April 14, 1938, at his home in Farmville. He is buried at Farmville Cemetery.

References

External links

1856 births
1938 deaths
Democratic Party Virginia state senators
19th-century American judges
20th-century American judges
19th-century American politicians
20th-century American politicians
People from Farmville, Virginia